Akudi (Bashkir and ) is a rural locality (a selo) in Starobazanovsky Selsoviet, Birsky District, Bashkortostan, Russia. The population was 467 as of 2010. There are 6 streets.

Geography 
Akudi is located 22 km southwest of Birsk (the district's administrative centre) by road. Srednebazanovo is the nearest rural locality.

References 

Rural localities in Birsky District